Alcantara, Alcântara (Portuguese), Alcántara (Spanish), Alcàntara, Alcàntera, El-Qantarah and (El) Kantara are all transliterations of the Arabic word al qantara (القنطرة), meaning "the bridge".

Alcantara may refer to:

People
 Alcantara (surname)

Places

Algeria
 El Kantara, town and commune in Biskra province
 El Kantara District, in Biskra province

Brazil
 Alcântara, Maranhão, city in the state of Maranhão
 Alcântara Launch Center, Maranhão, satellite launch center
 Alcântara River, Rio de Janeiro state
 Barra d'Alcântara, municipality in the state of Piauí
 Dom Pedro de Alcântara, municipality in the state Rio Grande do Sul
 São Pedro de Alcântara, Santa Catarina, municipality

Chile
 The area near Alcántara metro station in northeastern Santiago

Cyprus
 Kantara Castle, in the Kyrenia mountains

Egypt
 El-Qantarah el-Sharqiyya, city in the governorate of Shamal Sina, on the eastern side of the Suez Canal

Italy
 Alcantara (river) (Alcàntara in Sicilian), a river of Sicily

Philippines
 Alcantara, Cebu, municipality in the province of Cebu
 Alcantara, Romblon, municipality in the province of Romblon

Portugal
 Alcântara, Lisbon, civil parish of Lisbon
 São Pedro de Alcântara, Franciscan monastery in Lisbon

Spain
 , comarca (district) located in the province of Cáceres, Extremadura
 Alcántara, municipality in the province of Cáceres, Extremadura
 Alcántara Dam, in Tagus river near the town with the same name
 Alcántara Bridge, Roman bridge over the Tagus river near the town with the same name
 Valencia de Alcántara, municipality in the province of Cáceres, Extremadura
 Santiago de Alcántara, municipality in the province of Cáceres, Extremadura
 Herrera de Alcántara, municipality in the province of Cáceres, Extremadura
 Mata de Alcántara, municipality in the province of Cáceres, Extremadura
 Alcàntera de Xúquer, municipality in the comarca of Ribera Alta, Valencian Community
 San Pedro de Alcántara, town in the province of Málaga, Andalusia
 San Vicente de Alcántara, municipality in the province of Badajoz, Extremadura

Venezuela
 Francisco Linares Alcántara Municipality, municipality in Aragua state

Other uses
 Alcantara (material), covering material manufactured by Alcantara SpA, Italy
 Alcantara (plant), a genus of plants in the family Asteraceae
 Battle of Alcantara (disambiguation)
 Order of Alcántara, Spanish military order founded in the 12th century
 , British ocean liner of Royal Mail Steam Packet Company
 , British ocean liner of Royal Mail Lines

Cognate names
 Alcantarilla (diminutive of Alcántara), a municipality in Murcia, Spain
 Alcantarilha (diminutive of Alcântara), a parish in Portugal